Ugo Anzile (2 February 1931 – 25 April 2010) was a professional racing cyclist. He was born in Italy, where he obtained French nationality in 1954. He rode in four editions of the Tour de France. His brother Guido Anzile and uncle Gino Sciardis were also cyclists.

References

External links
 

1931 births
2010 deaths
Italian male cyclists
Cyclists from Friuli Venezia Giulia
People from the Province of Udine
Naturalized citizens of France
Italian emigrants to France